Imagine Asia (formerly known Wellmade Yedang), is a South Korean entertainment company established in 1976. The company operates as a talent agency, television production company, event management, concert production company, and music publishing house.

History
The company was founded in 1976 as Banpo Industries, an industrial tent manufacturer that was previously headquartered at Seongnam in Gyeonggi Province. In 2000, the company name was changed to Banpo Tech.

Banpo Tech merged in 2006 with Star M Entertainment, becoming Star M. Among the first artists on its roster were actors Shin Min-a, Jang Dong-gun and Hyun Bin. The company was listed on KOSDAQ in 2007.

In 2008, the company name was again changed, to Wellmade Star M. Its headquarters were moved to Gangnam District, Seoul.

In 2013, Wellmade Star M acquired Dream T Entertainment majority shareholders. In 2014, it merged with Yedang Company to form Wellmade Yedang. In 2015, the company acquired 39% shares of YMC Entertainment, its subsidiaries Dream T Entertainment also acquired 41% shares of YMC Entertainment and became a majority shareholders after having 80% shares of YMC. The company also acquired BLUE STAR Entertainment in the same year.

In March 2016, Yedang Entertainment officially renamed to Banana Culture and following Wellmade also renamed to Imagine Asia in June. However, Wellmade Yedang had continued as an independent company.

Artists

Actors/actresses

Cha Hwa-yeon (2018–present)
Choi Jung-won (2017–present)
Go Yoo-ahn
Hwang Young-hee
Im Soo-hyun
Jang Seo-hee (2017–present)
Jeon In-hwa
Jung Na-on
Kang Min-ah
Kim Da-hyun
Kim Ho-jin
Kim Jae-woon
Kim So-Ra
Lee Ho-suk
Lee Il-hwa (2016–present)
Lee Jung-jun
Na Hye-mi
Park Sang-myun
Park Sang-nam
Rho Sang-bo
Shim Eun-jin
Son Sung-yoon
Suh Ji-hee
Yoo Dong-geun
Yoo Gun-woo
Yook Jin-su

Entertainers
Jung Yi-rang

MCs
LJ

Subsidiaries

Dream T Entertainment
Dream T Entertainment was founded by Lee Jong-suk in 2009. Imagine Asia acquired it in December 2013.

YMC Entertainment
YMC Entertainment was founded in 2010 by Cho Yoo-myung, the eldest son of singer Tae Jin-ah. Imagine Asia along with Dream T Entertainment acquired it in July 2015. The label is now closed down as of 2020. Its website is now inaccessible.

Blue Star Entertainment
Blue Star Entertainment was founded by Byun Dong-jin and Park Chang-jae, former executives of Core Contents Media (now MBK Entertainment). Imagine Asia acquired it in 2015.

Groups
AA
C'est si bon

Actors
Nam Kyung-hee
Shin Ji-ae

Divisions

Wellmade Film
Wellmade Film is a film production company.

Films
The Warrior's Way (2010)
The Yellow Sea (황해) (2010) 
As One (코리아) (2012)
The Show Must Go On (우아한세게) (2007)
The Huntresses (조선 미녀 삼총사) (2014)

Dramas
Soul Mechanic (영혼수선공) (2020, in association with Monster Union)
Doctor Prisoner (닥터 프리즈너) (2019, in association with Jidam Inc.)
The Third Charm (제3의 매력) (2018, in association with JYP Pictures)
Come and Hug Me (이리와 안아줘) (2018, in association with Company Ching)
Mad Dog (매드 독) (2017, in association with Celltrion Entertainment)
Here Comes Mr Oh (오자룡이 간다) (2011–2013) 
Couples Too Rosy (장미빛 연인들) (2014–2015)

Happy Campus Projects 
Happy Campus Projects (재미난 프로젝트) is a drama production company under Imagine Asia, led by CEO Jung Ah-reum.

Drama
Entertainer (딴따라) (2016)
Wanted (원티드) (2016)
Schoolgirl Detectives (선얌여고 탐정단) (2014–2015)

On Da Com
On Da Com (also known as On多com) is a multimedia production company in Seoul, South Korea.

Reality television
Dad! Where Are We Going? (아빠! 어디가?) (2014–2015)
Section TV (섹션 TV) (1999–Current)
Good Morning (좋은아침) (1996–Current)
Southern Boy Northern Girl (남남 북녀) (2015–Current)
Peony Stick Club (모란봉 클럽) (2015–Current)
Infinite Girls (무한걸스) (2010–2013)
Real Story (猫) (2006–2010)

Former artists

Actors
Ha Ji-Won (2003–13)
Lee Jong-suk (2011–15)
Oh Yeon-seo (2006–17)
Seo Hyo-rim (2015–17)
Lee Joon-hyuk
Lee Sun-bin
Jo Sung-min
Jin Ji-hee (2016–19)
Shin Won-sik
Bae Hyo-won
Go Yoon
Im Ho-gul
Kim Ga-hwa
Kim Geum-bi
Kim Hyo-jin
Kim Youn-jun
Park Seul-maro
Park Min-su
Ryu Hwa-young (2013–2020)
Shim Min-chul
Shim Mina
Song Kyung-chul
Yoo A-ran
Yoon Seo

Recording artists
C-Clown (2012–2015)
Seo Ji-an

Blue Star Entertainment 
Kim Jin-hong (AA, 2013–2015)
Aoora (AA, 2011–2016)

Assets
ETN (cable TV channel)
Park&Noorigae (restaurant)
OnDaCom (production company)

References

External links
 
 Official blog  at Naver

South Korean companies established in 1976
Companies based in Seoul
Companies listed on KOSDAQ
Television production companies of South Korea
Film distributors of South Korea
Film production companies of South Korea
Broadcasting companies of South Korea
Music publishing companies of South Korea
Contemporary R&B record labels
K-pop record labels
Publishing companies established in 1976
Record labels established in 1976
South Korean brands
South Korean record labels
Synth-pop record labels
Electronic dance music record labels
Hip hop record labels
Talent agencies of South Korea